The Vardø Tunnel is a subsea road tunnel in Vardø Municipality in Troms og Finnmark county, Norway. The tunnel opened in 1982 and was the first subsea tunnel in Norway. King Olav V officially opened the tunnel on 16 August 1983.

References

External links

Road tunnels in Troms og Finnmark
Subsea tunnels in Norway
Vardø
1982 establishments in Norway
Tunnels completed in 1982
Roads within the Arctic Circle